Mahaboboka is a town and commune in Madagascar. It belongs to the district of Sakaraha, which is a part of Atsimo-Andrefana Region. The population of the commune was estimated to be approximately 13,115 in 2018.

Primary and junior level secondary education are available in town. The majority 80% of the population of the commune are farmers, while an additional 10% receives their livelihood from raising livestock. The most important crop is rice, while other important products are cassava and sweet potatoes.  Services provide employment for 8% of the population. Additionally fishing employs 2% of the population.

Economy
Natural gas has been discovered in Mahaboboka in 2016.

Also minerals, as sapphires are found at Mahaboboka.

Rivers
Mahaboboka lies at the Fiherenana River.

References and notes 

Populated places in Atsimo-Andrefana
Sapphire mines in Madagascar